Nasiru Muhammad Al-Muktar Kabara known as Nasiru Kabara, (18 April 1924 - 1996) He is a prominent Islamic scholar of Qadiriyya in Kano State, founder of darul Qadiriyya in Kano State and the former Leader of Qadiriyya in West Africa. He was succeeded by his son Qaribullahi Nasiru Kabara, He is also the father of the controversial Islamic scholar Abduljabbar Nasiru Kabara.

Early life 
He was born in Guringawa in Kano State. His great-grandfather was originally said to came from a Kabara harbor close to a river in Niger,  that is after the Jihad of Usman Dan Fodio in (1804-8), it was from there that he migrated to Hausa land, to Kano emirate in the late eighteenth century, where he settled opposite to the royal palace, where he was given a piece of land to settle, the plot and the neighborhood became what's today as Kabara ward "Unguwar Kabara".

Education 
Nasiru Kabara received most of his education from his prominent uncle and a well known scholar of Qadiriyya at that time, known as Malam Ibrahım Ahmad al-Kanawi Natsugune, who was one of the outstanding scholars in Kano State, His uncle and his teacher had served four different emir's as a religious counselor, he served Aliyu Babba, Abbas, Usman and Abdullahi Bayero, at that time his uncle was one of the important members of Qadiriyya brotherhood in his town.

He directs the sons of Kabara into two branches of Darika brotherhood that is the Kuntiyya and the Ahl al-Bayt, which was established by Shehu Usman Dan Fodio

Upon completing his studies in the late 1940s, Nasiru Kabara concentrated on the unification of the Qadiriyya movement in Kano under his leadership, onward he opened several mosques across the Hausa land as part of Qadiriyya movement, which makes him became the leader of the Qadiriyya sect in West Africa.

Islam 

He is the co-founder the Darul Qadiriyya (Qadiriyya house) in Kano State, where all Qadiriyya followers across West Africa regards it as the center of Qadiriyya in West Africa, he was given the title Nasiru Kabara, Al-Sinhaji, Al-ƙadiri, Al-Maliki, Al-Ash'ari, Sarkin Yaƙin (War Lord) of Shehu Usmanu Bin Fodiyo.

Qadiriyya movement 
He is the leader of Qadiriyya of West Africa, He has led them since the demise of his father Nasir Kabara.

Writings 
He wrote several Islamic books on Tafseer and Hadith, which was said to be over 300 books.

Family 
Nasiru Kabara have several children, but the prominent ones being Qaribullahi Nasiru Kabara eldest son and his successor, the other one being, Musal Qasuyuni and Abduljabbar Nasiru Kabara.

References

External links 
 https://org.uib.no/smi/sa/02/2Nasiru.pdf

People from Kano State
Hausa people
1996 deaths
1924 births